Karina Juliza Beteta Rubín (born January 18, 1975) is a Peruvian politician. Congresswoman representing Huánuco for the period 2006-2011 and in 2016 election was elected again, this time representing the Popular Force party for the period 2016 - 2021.

References

1975 births
Living people
People from Huánuco Region
Union for Peru politicians
Members of the Congress of the Republic of Peru
21st-century Peruvian women politicians
21st-century Peruvian politicians
Fujimorista politicians
Women members of the Congress of the Republic of Peru